The FIA Formula 3 Championship is a third-tier international single-seater racing championship and organised by the Fédération Internationale de l'Automobile (FIA). The championship launched in 2019 as a feeder series for the FIA Formula 1 World Championship and FIA Formula 2 Championships. It was the result of a merger between two third-tier single-seater racing championships, the GP3 Series and the FIA Formula 3 European Championship as it was announced on 10 March 2018. The championship is part of the FIA Global Pathway consolidation project plan. Unlike its predecessor, the Formula 3 European Championship, the series runs exclusively in support of Formula One races.

Origins and history

On 13 March 2017 it was announced that the GP3 Series would merge with the FIA and DMSB's FIA Formula 3 European Championship and as such, both bodies would merge their both third-tier open-wheel single seater formula racing series, the GP3 Series and FIA Formula 3 European Championship respectively, with plans to début in 2019. On 1 September 2017 the merger committee announced that World Motor Sport Council were selected to develop the name, logo and identity of the new series. The reveal date for the new series was 10 March 2018 at the FIA headquarters at Paris, France. GP3 Series CEO Bruno Michel announced the new sanctioning body would be sanctioned by FIA from 2019 season and thus become Formula One's sole support Grand Prix weekends mostly in Europe. FIA President Jean Todt then announced the new FIA Formula 3 Championship title and logo later in October 2018.

Race weekend
Pit stops are optional if there is a force majeure event like a change in weather conditions, tyre puncture, front or rear wing damage or others.

On Friday, there is one Free Practice session of 45 minutes and one Qualifying session of 30 minutes.

On Saturday, one Sprint Race will take place and will consist of 40 minutes + one lap. The starting grid will be determined by reversing the top 12 finishers of Friday’s Qualifying session.

On Sunday, the Feature Race will take place ahead of the Formula 1 Grand Prix and will consist of 45 minutes + one lap.

Points system
The top 10 finishers in the Sprint Race receive points as follows:

The top 10 finishers in the Feature Race receive points as follows:

The driver who qualified in pole position for the Feature race during Friday's qualifying session receives an additional 2 points.

In each race, one point will be awarded to the driver who achieves the fastest lap time, providing he was in the top 10 positions of the final race classification.

The maximum number of points a driver can score at any round will be 38.

A count-back system is used to decide places of drivers with equal points in the championship with the driver with most wins ranking highest of those with equal points totals. If there is still a tie, the most second-place finishes, then the most third-place finishes, etc., is used to split the tied drivers. This count-back system is applied at all stages of the championship.

Racing flags
These are the racing flags that usually used in FIA Formula 3 Championship race weekends:

Car
The FIA Formula 3 Championship car is used by all of the teams, and features a Dallara carbon-fiber monocoque chassis powered by a Mecachrome naturally-aspirated direct-injected V6 engine and Pirelli dry slick and rain treaded tyres.

Chassis
The F3 Championship will use the 2019 specification F3 2019 car which has been designed by Dallara Automobili. The new FIA Formula 3 Championship chassis material is Carbon/aluminium honeycomb structure and also Carbon Aramid honeycomb bodywork structure. The new FIA Formula 3 Championship car's front wings are slightly wider and also wider-lower rear wing.

Engine

First generation (second-generation overall)
The series will remain using the 3.4-litre V6 naturally-aspirated direct-injected engines supplied by Mecachrome until at least the 2021 season due to FIA Formula 3 Championship not being interested in a turbocharged engine.

Mecachrome V634 F3 V6 engines were crated and shipped to all FIA Formula 3 Championship teams on a serial-number basis as determined by the FIA to ensure equality and fairness in distribution.

Fuel and lubricants components
All Formula 3 cars currently use ordinary unleaded racing gasoline as fuel (similar to commercial vehicle unleaded street gasoline), which has been the de facto standard in third tier single-seater formula racing since the introduction of GP3 Series in 2010. Since 2019, Elf has continued to be the exclusive provider of the LMS 102 RON unleaded fuel and also Elf HTX 840 0W-40 lubricants for all FIA Formula 3 Championship cars until 2022.

In 2023, Aramco became the official fuel and lubricant partner and supplier of all FIA Formula 3 Championship entrants.

Transmission, gearbox and clutches
The current gearbox has been manufactured by Hewland and features an 8-position barrel with ratchet body and software upgrades as well as a new transverse shafts fixing system designed to facilitate improved gear selection. Currently, the FIA Formula 3 Championship gearbox uses a 6-speed sequential gearbox configuration with electro-hydraulic control via paddle-shifters, with reverse operated by a reverse button on the steering wheel. The clutches of all FIA Formula 3 Championship cars are supplied by AP Racing with the multi-plate clutch operated by a hand-paddle lever.

Wheels and tyres
O.Z. Racing exclusively supply wheel rims for all FIA Formula 3 Championship cars.

Pirelli will continue supplying tyres for all FIA Formula 3 Championship cars as they have done since the GP3 Series era. The tyre size of all cars will still remain the same as in the GP3 Series. The tyre sizes are 250/575-R13 on the fronts and 290/590-R13 on the rears. The compounds of Pirelli Formula 3 tyres are currently three dry compounds (red soft, yellow medium and white hard) carrying the "P Zero" brand and one wet compound (blue wet) carrying the "Cinturato" brand.

Brakes
Brembo supplies monobloc brake calipers and disc bells, which are exclusive to the FIA Formula 3 Championship. Carbone Industrie also supplies carbon brake discs and pads for the championship.

Suspension
The suspension of all FIA Formula 3 Championship cars is upper and lower steel wishbones, pushrod operated, coupled with twin Koni dampers and torsion bars suspension (front) and spring suspension (rear) similar to current Formula One car suspension.

Steering wheel
From the 2019 season, all FIA Formula 3 Championship cars will utilize the all-new XAP Single-seat Formula 2451 S3 steering wheel with a larger dash screen and also three new rotary switches (similar to the current FIA Formula E and FIA Formula 2 steering wheel).

Safety
The current safety innovation of FIA Formula 3 Championship is the top priority. Front, side, rear and steering column impact tests are the FIA safety standards. All of the FIA Formula 3 Championship cars include front and rear roll hoop, impact structures and monocoque push tests. Anti-intrusion survival cell protection panels are also featured since 2019. Wheel retainer safety cables are also featured to avoid wheel flying similar to Formula One, IndyCar Series (known as SWEMS) and other single-seater Formula racing series. The seat belts of all FIA Formula 3 Championship cars are supplied by Sabelt with 6-point seat belt configuration similar to Formula One. From 2019 onwards the “halo” cockpit protection system was added.

Other components
All FIA Formula 3 cars carry a Magneti Marelli-provided electronic control unit as well as Magneti Marelli power supply management unit. Live telemetry is used only for television broadcasts, but the data can be recorded from the ECU to the computer if the car is in the garage and not on the track.

Rear view mirrors for all FIA Formula 3 cars are mandated for easy viewing of opponents behind.

Aerodynamics
The aerodynamics of current FIA Formula 3 Championship cars are resembling the Formula One 2017-style aerodynamic with wider and curved front wing and also lower rear wing with parallelogram rear wing plate. Side winglets are also banned. The undertrays of all FIA Formula 3 Championship cars are grounds-effect underbody as opposed to flat-bottom underbody that usually utilized in Formula One.

Drag Reduction Systems (DRS)

Since 2017 GP3 Series season, the Drag Reduction Systems (DRS) were introduced in a purpose for overtaking maneuver assist by tilting the upper-element rear wing while approaching the opponent less than a second away by activating the DRS paddle behind the steering wheel. The upper-element rear wing angle of FIA Formula 3 car rear wing is the same angle as Formula One car which has over 40 degrees of angle. In an event of rainy conditions, Drag Reduction Systems are automatically deactivated for safety reasons.

Other parts
The car also features internal cooling upgrades, a new water radiator, radiator duct, oil/water heat exchanger, modified oil degasser, new oil and water pipes and new heat exchanger fixing brackets.

Specifications
Engine displacement:  DOHC V6
Gearbox: 6-speed paddle shift sequential semi-automatic gearbox (must have reverse)
Weight:  including driver and fuel
Power output: 
Fuel: Elf LMS 102 RON unleaded (2019-present) later Aramco Advanced 55% sustainable fuels (2023-present)
Fuel capacity: 
Fuel delivery: Direct fuel injection
Aspiration: Naturally aspirated
Length: 
Width: 
Wheelbase: 
Steering:  Manual, rack and pinion (no power steering)
Tyres: Pirelli P Zero slick dry and Pirelli Cinturato treaded wet

Costs

While intended as a comparatively low cost development series, the absolute costs of competing in the championship are well beyond the personal financial means of most individuals.

One estimate puts the cost of competing in the FIA Formula 3 championship at approximately 1.2 million USD per season.  This is approximately half the cost of competing in the F2 championship.  Typically, most of these costs must be paid by the driver, through personal sponsorship, or personal or family wealth. 

A number of cost control measures were introduced by the FIA for the 2021 season.

Seasons

2019

The inaugural season of the FIA Formula 3 Championship consisted of 16 races held across eight rounds at European circuits, beginning on 11 May at the Circuit de Barcelona-Catalunya and ending on 29 September at the Sochi Autodrom. 2019 marked the debut of the new Dallara F3 2019 chassis, powered by a naturally-aspirated 3.4L V6 engine developed by Mecachrome, the same engine used in the car's GP3 Series predecessor the Dallara GP3/16.

Prema Racing won the teams' championship, scoring over twice as many points as runners-up Hitech Grand Prix and extending their streak to seven consecutive teams' championships from the predecessor FIA Formula 3 European Championship. The three Prema Racing drivers finished in the top three positions in the drivers' championship. Robert Shwartzman finished the season as champion, having taken three race wins including the first race in Barcelona. Marcus Armstrong finished as runner-up with Jehan Daruvala in third.

2020

The 2020 championship was due to begin at the Bahrain International Circuit on 21 March, with Circuit Paul Ricard being dropped from the calendar in favour of Circuit Zandvoort. However, the first three rounds of the championship were postponed in response to the COVID-19 pandemic. A revised calendar was published in June, consisting of 18 races across nine rounds held alongside the first nine races of the Formula One World Championship. The season began at the Red Bull Ring on 4 July and concluded at the Mugello Circuit on 13 September.

Prema Racing secured their eighth consecutive teams' championship with three races left to go. Prema driver Oscar Piastri ended the season as champion, securing the title at the final race. He finished three points ahead of ART Grand Prix driver Théo Pourchaire, with Prema's Logan Sargeant in third place.

2021

As a cost-cutting measure, the 2021 championship calendar was reduced to seven rounds with each round consisting of three races, featuring twenty-one races in total, in line with changes made to the 2021 FIA Formula 2 Championship. The rounds at Silverstone Circuit, Autodromo Nazionale di Monza and Mugello Circuit were dropped from the calendar, and the rounds at Circuit Paul Ricard and Circuit Zandvoort returned, having been cancelled in 2020. The championship began on 8 May at the Circuit de Barcelona-Catalunya. The season was initially intended to conclude on 24 October at the Circuit of the Americas, however this was cancelled and replaced with a round at the Sochi Autodrom, ending on 26 September.

The drivers' championship was won by Prema Racing's Dennis Hauger, who took four race victories and claimed the championship title with two races remaining. Trident drivers Jack Doohan and Clément Novalak finished second and third respectively. Trident ended Prema Racing's streak of teams' championship victories, claiming the title at the final race by a margin of four points.

2022

The series took returned to its pre-2021 race format with two races per round, and featured nine rounds. The rounds at Silverstone and Monza returned to the calendar, whilst the rounds at Circuit Paul Ricard and Sochi were removed. The calendar featured two new venues, with Bahrain and Imola Circuit hosting races for the first time. The scoring format was also changed, reducing the number of points on offer for sprint races, fastest laps and pole positions. The series' first team change took place in 2022; HWA Racelab left the championship and was replaced by Van Amersfoort Racing. The championship began in Bahrain on 19 March and concluded at Monza on 11 September.

ART Grand Prix driver Victor Martins clinched the drivers' championship at the final race, prior to which there were six drivers mathematically in title contention. Runner-up was Trident's Zane Maloney followed by Prema Racing driver Oliver Bearman. Prema Racing reclaimed the teams' championship ahead of second-placed Trident.

2023

Champions

Drivers

Teams

Drivers graduated to FIA Formula 2 Championship
Bold denotes an active FIA Formula 2 driver.

Drivers graduated to Formula One
 Bold denotes an active Formula One driver.

Wins

Drivers' total wins

Teams' total wins

Circuits 

 Bold denotes a current Formula One Circuit.

 Italic denotes a former Formula One Circuit.

See also
 Formula Three
 List of FIA Formula 3 Championship drivers
 Formula One
 Formula Two

Notes

References

External links
FIA official website

 
FIA Formula 3
One-make series
Recurring sporting events established in 2019
2019 establishments in Europe
2019 establishments in North America